The 1979 Masters (also known as the 1979 Colgate-Palmolive Masters for sponsorship reasons) was a men's tennis tournament held in Madison Square Garden, New York City, United States between 9 January and 13 January 1980.  It was the year-end championship of the 1979 Colgate-Palmolive Grand Prix tour.

Finals

Singles

 Björn Borg defeated  Vitas Gerulaitis, 6–2, 6–2
 It was Borg's 13th singles title of the year and 52nd of his career.

Doubles

 Peter Fleming /  John McEnroe defeated  Wojciech Fibak /  Tom Okker 6–3, 7–6, 6–1

See also
 1979 World Championship Tennis Finals

References

 
Grand Prix tennis circuit year-end championships
Tennis tournaments in the United States
Colgate-Palmolive Masters
Colgate-Palmolive Masters
Colgate-Palmolive Masters
Colgate-Palmolive Masters